Cyme suavis is a moth of the subfamily Arctiinae first described by Pagenstecher in 1886. It is found in New Guinea.

References

Nudariina
Moths of New Guinea